List of works by or about Martha Nussbaum, American philosopher.

Books
 
 
 
 
 
 
 
 
 
 
  Originally an essay (pdf).
 
 
 
 
 
 
 
  
Translated into Spanish as 
 
 
 
 
 
 
Translated into Spanish as  
Translated into Greek as Όχι για το κέρδος, ΟΙ ΑΝΘΡΩΠΙΣΤΙΚΕΣ ΣΠΟΥΔΕΣ ΠΡΟΑΓΟΥΝ ΤΗ ΔΗΜΟΚΡΑΤΙΑ Nussbaum Martha
Translated into Russian as   
 
 
 
 
 
 
 Nussbaum, Martha and Levmore, Saul (2017).  Aging Thoughtfully: Conversations about Retirement, Romance, Wrinkles, and Regret. New York, Oxford University Press, 2017.
 Nussbaum, Martha C. (2018).  The Monarchy of Fear: A Philosopher Looks at Our Political Crisis. New York: Simon and Schuster.
 
Nussbaum, Martha (2019). The Cosmopolitan Tradition: A Noble but Flawed Ideal. Harvard University Press.

Articles, chapters and other contributions
 Nussbaum, Martha. (1992). The Professor of Parody: The Hip Defeatism of Judith Butler in The New Republic, 22: p. 37-45.
 
 
 
 
  Pdf.
See also:  Pdf.
 
 Nussbaum, Martha (2017), Sex, Love and the Aging Woman,  NYTimes, 2017

Critical studies and reviews of Nussbaum's work
The clash within
 
Creating capabilities
 

Bibliographies by writer
Bibliographies of American writers